Elfrieden Bloom OBE (nee Wenzel; 6 February 1914 – 20 May 2000) was a journalist, author and campaigner for the rights of deaf children.

Biography
Her parents were Robert and Emmy Wenzel, who were a German diplomat and a journalist. Growing up in New York, she graduated from Columbia University and subsequently studied at Trinity College, Dublin.

Her two marriages were both to medical officers of the British Army. Her first husband died of pleurisy shortly after arriving in Malaya near the beginning of World War II. Days after her second marriage, to Philip Bloom, they were incarcerated as prisoners of war after the Japanese capture of Singapore, and suffered terrible conditions in captivity until their release at the war's end in 1945.

Bloom's first daughter Virginia was born profoundly deaf, and Bloom devoted herself to overcoming the challenges of deafness for her daughter and for other deaf children. She became chair of the National Deaf Children's Society in which role she served until 1965, and remained a vice-president for the rest of her life.

Sources
 

1914 births
2000 deaths
British women journalists
German emigrants to the United States
American emigrants to the United Kingdom
Columbia University alumni
Alumni of Trinity College Dublin